Chilo aleniella is a moth in the family Crambidae. It was described by Strand in 1913. It is found in Equatorial Guinea.

References

Chiloini
Moths described in 1913